PFC Lokomotiv Plovdiv, commonly known as Loko Plovdiv, is a Bulgarian professional football club based in Plovdiv. Lokomotiv's home ground is the Lokomotiv Stadium which is situated in Lauta Park and has a capacity of 14,000 spectators.

Founded on 25 July 1926, Lokomotiv is one of the most popular teams in Bulgaria and currently competes in the top-flight First League, which they have won once (in 2004). Lokomotiv Plovdiv has won also 2 Bulgarian Cups, 2 Bulgarian Supercups and 1 Cup of the Soviet Army. The biggest success of the club in Europe is reaching the third round of the Inter-Cities Fairs Cup in 1965, after narrowly losing to the Italian Juventus in a play-off match.

Lokomotiv have a fierce local rivalry with fellow Plovdiv-based team Botev Plovdiv. Matches between the two sides are known as the Plovdiv derby.

History 
Throughout the club's history, it has undergone a number of complex reorganisations. These were in part due to the political environment in Bulgaria during the communist period (1944-1989) which led to enforced changes in the nature of sporting clubs throughout the country in order to follow the "Soviet model". For PFC Lokomotiv Plovdiv, these changes led to the merger of two separate existing teams, different in nature, which in turn has led to misinterpretations of the history of the teams. In order to understand the origin of the contemporary team, Lokomotiv's history can be divided into two major branches – one defined largely by its followers (Sportclub Plovdiv), and the other by its functional characteristics, association with the railway, and funding as a labour union team (ZSK Plovdiv).

Roots of the Club (until 1944)

Sportclub Plovdiv
In the spring of 1922, the sport club Karadzha was founded when several casual amateur football teams in one of the districts of Plovdiv consolidated so the players could compete in the Championship of Plovdiv. Two years later, in 1924, another sport club called Atletik was formed in the same district.

On 25 July 1926 Karadzha and Atletik merged to form Sportclub. The team chose white, black and red as the colours for their kits and crest. Several years later, the year of establishment (1926) was added to the crest. Lokomotiv Plovdiv still uses the same colours, while their full name (Professional Football Club Lokomotiv 1926 Plovdiv) shows the club's beginnings as the same year in which Sportclub was founded.

Sportclub had its home ground in the city centre. However, after the 1928 earthquakes, the team donated its land to those who had lost their homes so they could rebuild there. From 1928 on, Sportclub did not have their own football field for more than two decades.

In the years after Sportclub was created, the team competed in the local Championship of Plovdiv. In the early years of Bulgarian football, there was no national league. The local championships, held at a regional level, were the most prestigious football tournaments in the country. Sportclub participated in the second division until 1933, when the team finished first and was promoted to Plovdiv's top tier as of 1939. In 1940, Sportclub became the Champion of Plovdiv for the first time.

In 1939 the team joined the National Football Division – the countrywide football league which had been formed only a year earlier and which included Bulgaria's top ten teams. However, in 1940 the league was disbanded because of World War II.

During World War II, the team participated in several other tournaments including the Tsar's Cup, which was considered Bulgaria's most prestigious knock-out cup tournament at the time and a predecessor of the current domestic cup tournament. In the Tsar's Cup the team reached the finals twice – in 1940 and 1942.

By the time of communist rule in Bulgaria in 1944, Sportclub had become one of the best performing teams in the country, reaching the finals in many tournaments. The club had become the biggest in the Plovdiv region in terms of members and continually set attendance records for the period.

The Club of the Railway Workers in Plovdiv
In the mid-1930s, the railway workers' and sailors' labour union established numerous cultural and sporting organisations across the country. The railway workers established a sports club in Plovdiv as well, since the city is one of the major railway centres in the country.

For the first few years, ZSK Plovdiv lagged behind other teams in the city such as Sportclub and Botev Plovdiv. The team was not recognized as a full member of the national sport federation until three years after its creation. However, by the early 1940s they had improved and in 1944 they won the Championship of Plovdiv.

From an economic perspective, the railway club contributed heavily to the development of sports in the region, making large investments in the improvement of sporting facilities and conditions in the city. Most notably, the powerful national railway company, through ZSK Plovdiv, was the main benefactor for the creation of a state-of-the-art multi-purpose stadium that opened in 1943. The stadium was constructed on the football pitch of the existing team Levski Plovdiv and as such was the home ground for both ZSK Plovdiv and Levski Plovdiv. As a result, the stadium was named ZSK-Levski.

Creation of Lokomotiv Plovdiv (1944–1954)

Changes in Sportclub
In the years after 1944, the newly established communist rule embarked on several campaigns for the "reorganisation of the sporting clubs in Bulgaria" to make them align with the Soviet political agenda and follow the "Soviet model" of sport clubs. This meant that every local region should have its own sports club, but in order to make central investments more efficient for a larger member-base, only a few clubs were permitted per area. That led to the forced merger of clubs within the same locality.

Starting in 1944 Sportclub was merged with numerous other teams in the same district of Plovdiv. Another merger followed in 1945 with the Catholic club . After this wave of mergers, like many other clubs in the country, the club was renamed to an abbreviation of the biggest clubs – S.P.-45, meaning Sportclub Parchevich – 1945. However, due to the non-Slavic background of the words "sport" and "club", the team was officially renamed again before the start of the season to Slavia Plovdiv.

In 1947 a new wave of consolidations saw Slavia Plovdiv merged with the cooperative workers' union team, . This merger created a club known as Slavia-Chengelov.

During 1944–1955, the club reached the domestic knock-out cup finals (at the time the Cup of the Soviet Army) for the third time in its history – in 1948 as Slavia-Chengelov.

In the 1948 season the club became one of the ten founding teams of the new national top league – "A" Republican Football Group (A RFG), the predecessor of the current Bulgarian top division league.

Through the mergers, the club originally named Sportclub kept its original colours and core team, with only a small number of players considered good enough to find a place in the first team of the "new" club. The supporters remained loyal to the colours and the players, and the followers of the assimilated clubs joined them, increasing the number of fans and members of the largest club in Plovdiv at that time. Though technically the numerous clubs merged, because of the sheer size of Sportclub in terms of members, the smaller clubs were effectively assimilated into the larger club.

Changes in ZSK
For ZSK Plovdiv, reorganisation began in the autumn of 1944. The club was initially merged with the team with which it shared a stadium, Levski Plovdiv, to form ZSK-Levski. However, unlike most other forced mergers at that time, the ZSK-Levski merger was dissolved in less than a year.

After the separation in 1945, ZSK was renamed to Lokomotiv Plovdiv similar to other teams in various Eastern bloc countries which were connected with the railways. Lokomotiv Plovdiv and Levski continued to co-exist as separate entities, still sharing the same stadium.

Although railway workers' club was financially backed by the national railway, in the early years of communist rule the football team competed only at the third level of the recently formed national league. Furthermore, the club was the smallest in Plovdiv in terms of members and attracted only a modest number of spectators for its games, despite its large, state-of-the-art stadium.

Merger of Slavia-Chengelov and Lokomotiv Plovdiv
In the summer of 1949, the Bulgarian Communist Party adopted a new principle governing the construction of sports clubs. Clubs had to serve primarily as physical fitness departments of politically important national enterprises, such as oil refineries, police, army, national railway, and others. Thus, the geographical location of a club was no longer important and clubs were assigned to the major institutions in the country.

The reorganisation of 1949 assigned Lokomotiv to assimilate Slavia-Chengelov, since Lokomotiv was already a team strongly associated with a significant national enterprise. By that time, Slavia-Chengelov was the largest club in Bulgaria in terms of members, and with an even larger fan base.

DSO Energiya was formed from this merger prior to the start of the 1950 season. They used Slavia-Chengelov's colours (white, red, and black) for both their kits and crest and the team itself retained only four players from Lokomotiv, with the core of the squad being players from Slavia-Chengelov. More than two decades after the 1928 earthquake, the fans of what was once Sportclub again had a home ground – the stadium of Lokomotiv. Changes in the formal names of clubs in the Soviet Union took place and a popular name for Eastern bloc sports clubs at the time, Torpedo, was adopted and the team was thus renamed Torpedo Plovdiv.

For the 1950 season, Torpedo Plovdiv took the place of Slavia-Chengelov at the top level of the Bulgarian football league system (A RFG). National policy then required that, as part of the railway union, all club members and players had to be members of the union. This included former members of Slavia-Chengelov, who had no connection to the railways.

Before the 1951 season began, the railway union established a new club, DSO Lokomotiv (Plovdiv), which shared Torpedo's colours and stadium. Torpedo's players were transferred to DSO Lokomotiv, and in order to make them official union members each player was nominally employed by the national railways. Meanwhile, Torpedo Plovdiv was removed from the labour union and no longer funded by it or the railway company. DSO Lokomotiv also acquired Torpedo's license to play in the top tier of the Bulgarian football league, while Torpedo was relegated to the third division. The labour union thus effectively legitimised the new club without needing to limit the access of the members of Torpedo to the sports facilities. Existing members of Torpedo could still use the shared facilities and were no longer required to be members of the railway union.

As of 1951 the fans of Torpedo Plovdiv from 1950 now found themselves supporting the same players, with the same colours, in the same stadium, under a new name. As official membership in the club now required a job with the railways, the official number of members was drastically smaller than in previous years. Nevertheless, the supporters of the team remained the same. Hence, in 1951 DSO Lokomotiv effectively became the successor to Torpedo while Torpedo still competed at a lower level.

From 1951-1954 DSO Lokomotiv was one of the best performers in the Bulgarian football elite, annually reaching at least the quarter-final phase of the domestic cup competition (at that time the Cup of the Soviet Army) and regularly finishing high in the top division league.

First Relegation from the Elite (1955–1960)
In 1955 DSO Lokomotiv's playing squad changed entirely – many aging key players were transferred to other teams, but their replacements seemed to be unable to collaborate and were not of the same quality. At the end of the 1955 season DSO Lokomotiv were relegated to the second division.

DSO Lokomotiv played in the second division for five seasons until it returned to the elite level for season 1961–62. In the same year, the team reached the domestic cup finals for the fourth time (after 1940 and 1942 as Sportclub, and 1948 as Slavia-Chengelov), but again lost.

In 1957 another sport reorganisation occurred and clubs were no longer required to be affiliated with national enterprises; instead, teams returned to geographical regions. Thus, sport clubs no longer needed to be "DSO" (English: "voluntary sports organisation"). Consequently, DSO Lokomotiv assimilated Torpedo Plovdiv and Septemvri (Plovdiv), changing its name to Lokomotiv Plovdiv, which it has retained to this day.

Success Home and Abroad (1961–1984)
After rejoining the elite (A RFG) in 1961, it took Lokomotiv seven years to reach the top three and get a medal in the 1968-69 season.

Internationally, the team achieved success more quickly. In the 1964–65 season, Lokomotiv Plovdiv reached the third round of the Inter-Cities Fairs Cup, where after two draws with the Italian team Juventus, a third play-off match was chosen by UEFA to be played in Torino. The game ended with a narrow loss by Lokomotiv with a score of 2:1. 

Before reaching the third round, Lokomotiv had previously eliminated the Serbian FK Vojvodina and the Romanian FC Petrolul Ploieşti. Key players during this period include forward Gocho Vasilev, star midfielder Hristo Bonev, defender Ivan Boyadzhiev and goalkeeper Stancho Bonchev.

In 1971, the team reached the domestic cup finals but again lost, this time to Levski Sofia with a score of 3:0.

In 1973, Lokomotiv won the A RFG silver medals, finishing the season with 43 points. In 1974, Lokomotiv finished the season in third place receiving the league bronze. The team was quite stable over the next few years and rarely under 6th place in the league table. Among the team's players was Hristo Bonev – considered by most Lokomotiv fans as the greatest player and one of the greatest Bulgarian-born players.

In the 1979-80 season Lokomotiv Plovdiv was again relegated to Bulgaria's second football division, but took three seasons to earn back its place.

While being in second division between 1981 and 1983, the team reached the finals in the Cup of the Soviet Army twice. On 12 June 1982 the team lost the domestic cup final for the sixth time.

In 1982 the team acquired Lokomotiv Stadium, situated in Lauta Park near the city's newest district. It is part of a multi-sports complex also used by the club's other sports teams (such as volleyball, tennis and boxing). The inauguration event was scheduled for Monday 6 September 1982 with a match against Neftochimic Burgas (Lokomotiv prevailed 4–1).

1982–83 Cup of the Soviet Army Winners
On 1 June 1983, led by Hristo Bonev, Lokomotiv won their first national cup by beating FC Chirpan 3:1 at Vasil Levski National Stadium in Sofia. The Cup of the Soviet Army, held annually between 1946 and 1990, is recognised by the Bulgarian Football Union (BFU) as the primary domestic knock-out cup tournament until 1982. In 1981, the Bulgarian Cup began to be held every year and overtook the significance of the Cup of the Soviet Army. BFU's current official policy considers the Bulgarian Cup to be the primary domestic knock-out cup from 1983 onwards. Thus Lokomotiv Plovdiv is not officially recognised as the bearer of the domestic cup for 1983.

In the 1983-84 season, the team was again relegated to second level and played the 1984-85 season at that level. In 1985 it rejoined A RFG.

1985–2000
After its return to the top division in 1985 the team had a consistent performance for over a decade, placing itself in the middle of the league table until the late 1990s. During that time the team finished in the top three once, in the 1991-92 season. In the 1998–99 and 1999-00 seasons Lokomotiv Plovdiv played in B PFG.

Georgi Iliev era (2001-2004)
In 2001 the club was purchased by Georgi Iliev, who at the time owned another football club, Velbazhd Kyustendil. It finished in third place in the top division for three consecutive seasons until 2000-01 and was national cup runner-up in 2001.

During the 2001-02 season, Iliev merged the two teams creating the contemporary Lokomotiv Plovdiv (Professional Football Club Lokomotiv 1926 Plovdiv). The new club is the official successor of the Lokomotiv club that merged with Velbazhd and uses the same colours. The team was formed almost entirely from the high-ranking players from Velbazhd Kyustendil's later years. The team finished third at the end of the season.

2003–04 Champions and Supercup Winners

The most successful season in the club's history was the 2003-04 campaign. Lokomotiv won the title, the only one in the club's history so far. Coach and former legendary player Eduard Eranosyan started well, with Lokomotiv leading the league by six points halfway through the season and remaining unbeaten. In the penultimate 29th round, the team defeated Slavia Sofia in Plovdiv by 3:2 in front of more than 17,000 spectators and won the Bulgarian championship. Lokomotiv finished the season with 75 points, 3 more than the second team, Levski Sofia. In the team lines was recent acquisition Martin Kamburov who became the top goalscorer of the league with 25 goals. Key players during the season included Vasil Kamburov, Georgi Iliev, Aleksandar Tunchev, Kiril Kotev, Vladimir Ivanov, Metodi Stoynev and Macedonians Boban Jančevski, Vančo Trajanov and Robert Petrov.

On 31 July 2004, Lokomotiv won the Bulgarian Supercup, after beating Litex Lovech at Lazur Stadium. The captain Ivan Paskov scored a brilliant header in the last seconds of the game for the 1:0 win.

A few months later, the team played for the first time in the UEFA Champions League qualifying rounds where they faced Club Brugge from Belgium in the second qualifying round.

2005–2015 
In 2004-05 the team finished third in the A PFG and qualified for the UEFA Cup. In the European club competition, Lokomotiv defeated Serbian OFK Beograd in the second qualifying round (1:0 home win and 1:2 away loss) and were drawn to play against the English Bolton Wanderers in the first round. However, the team from Plovdiv was eliminated after a 1–2 loss at the Reebok Stadium in Bolton and another 1–2 loss in a match played at the Lazur Stadium in Burgas.

In the next few months the club had significant financial problems causing many of the champions' team players such as Aleksandar Tunchev, Martin Kamburov, Ivan Paskov, Georgi Iliev, Darko Spalević, Kiril Kotev and Boban Jančevski to leave.

In the 2005-06 season Lokomotiv finished 5th in A PFG and qualified for the Intertoto Cup. They were eliminated with a 2-3 (1-2 away loss and a 1-1 home draw) on aggregate by Romanian Farul Constanţa.

In the next three seasons, the team finished in the middle of the table. In December 2009, businessman and ex-Vihren Sandanski owner Konstantin Dinev acquired the club from Galina Topalova in a 2 million euro bid, with the intention to bring them back to European club competition.

Hristo Krusharski era (2016–present)

2018–19 Bulgarian Cup Winners

On 15 May 2019, Lokomotiv Plovdiv won the Bulgarian Cup for the first time in the club's history, defeating local rivals Botev Plovdiv 1–0 in Sofia. The winning goal came in the 73th minute with a back heel kick of Alen Ožbolt. Ante Aralica provided the assist.

Winning the Bulgarian Cup enabled the team to play in the Europa League second qualifying round for the 2019–20 season. In the second round, Lokomotiv faced FC Spartak Trnava of Slovakia. Lokomotiv won the tie on aggregate, with a score of 3–3, progressing to the next round via the away goals rule. The next round's opponent was Strasbourg. Lokomotiv entered as outsiders against the French side, and lost the first game 0–1 in Bulgaria. In the second match, Lokomotiv Plovdiv again lost with a minimum score of 1-0, being eliminated on aggregate 0–2.

2019–20 Bulgarian Cup and Supercup Winners

On 1 July 2020, Lokomotiv beat CSKA Sofia on the final match played in Sofia and clinched the Bulgarian Cup for a second consecutive time, becoming the first team winning two consecutive cups after Litex Lovech in 2008 and 2009. The Smurfs defeated CSKA Sofia after a penalty shootout (5–3).

On 2 August 2020, Lokomotiv won the Bulgarian Supercup for the second time, defeating Ludogorets 0–1 at Ludogorets Arena (Ludogorets home ground). The winning goal was scored in the last minute of the regular time with a volley kick of the captain Dimitar Iliev.

Lokomotiv beat Iskra Danilovgrad of Montenegro 1–0 in the first Europa League qualifying round on 27 August 2020. Due to the Covid-19 pandemic, all Europa League qualifying ties this season before the play-off round featured only one leg. In the second qualifying round Lokomotiv faced Jose Mourinho's Tottenham Hotspur and it was close to eliminate the English team after the goal of Georgi Minchev, but Spurs complete late turnaround after two red cards for Lokomotiv players.

Lokomotiv finished on 2nd place in the regular season and qualified for the Championship Round maintaining their status in the top three until the last round of the season.

The Smurfs started the 2020/21 season with a match against Slovácko in a second qualifying round of the Europa Conference League. Lokomotiv won the first match at Lokomotiv Stadium 1-0 with a 90th-minute winner of Petar Vitanov and loss with the same scoreline in Uherské Hradiště. In the penalty shoot-out Ilko Pirgov parried 3 consecutive penalties and Lokomotiv won 3-2.

In the third qualifying round Lokomotiv were eliminated by Copenhagen of Danmark, following a 1-1 draw in Plovdiv and a 4-2 loss in the return leg at Parken Stadium.

In the league, Lokomotiv won the silver medals for the second time in club's history, finishing the season with 61 points.

Crest and colors
The configuration of the crest consists of a shield colored in red and black and a golden letter 'L' placed in the center. A white stripe with the inscription 'Plovdiv' is positioned on the upper part of the shield. The wings at the bottom of the shield represent the historical bond between the football club and the national railway company.

Lokomotiv Plovdiv's traditional home colors are white, black and red. In the past the club has also adopted sky blue as a kit color.

Names 
Lokomotiv was founded as Sportclub Plovdiv in 1926 and has carried a plethora of names throughout its history. In chronological order, they are as follows:
 Sportclub Plovdiv in 1926.
 S.P. 45 (Sportclub Parchevich 1945) in 1945.
 Slavia Plovdiv in 1946 and 1949.
 Slavia-Chengelov Plovdiv in 1947.
 Energia Plovdiv in 1949 (from 5 to 11 October).
 Torpedo Plovdiv in 1949.
 Lokomotiv Plovdiv since 1951.

Stadium

Lokomotiv Stadium, nicknamed Lauta after the name of the park in which the stadium is situated, is a multi-purpose stadium located in southeastern Plovdiv, Bulgaria. Designed by architect Zdravko Vasilkov, the stadium was officially opened on Bulgarian Unification Day on 6 September 1982 and is a part of a sports complex, which includes an indoor athletic hall, a volleyball hall, five tennis courts and three training pitches. The main pitch length is 105 metres and the width is 71 metres.

The stadium initially held a capacity of 24,000 people. The record attendance was back in 1983 when Lokomotiv played against Chernomorets Burgas in a playoff game for entering the Country's top tier league. There were 33,000 people attending this game and at least 6,000 of those were actually outside of the stadium.

On 25 July 2019, the stadium hosted its first ever European competition game, as Lokomotiv defeated Spartak Trnava 2–0 in a Europa League fixture in front of nearly 10,000 spectators. This date also matched with Lokomotiv's 93rd birthday and the win was a great gift for the thousands of people attending the game.

In 2020 after a government funding for the Plovdiv city football infrastructure the works on the new Bessica stand started with the completion date set for the summer of 2022. Also by the end of the same year the opposite south stand were demolished and preparation started for the foundations of the stand. Both the north and south stands are planned to host 2,846 spectators each and being completed by the end of 2022.
 After the Bessica and south stand are completed, the west stand called Sportclub is expected to be the next one to be demolished and build back up from the scratch. The total capacity for the stadium is planned to be 14,000 after the construction works are completed by the summer of 2024.

Support

Since its foundation, Lokomotiv has been one of the best supported football clubs in Bulgaria. Its fans broke attendance records on numerous occasions in the early years despite hardships (the team did not have a home ground for more than 20 years after the 1928 earthquake). By the 1940s the club was one of the largest in the country in terms of officially registered members. In 1968 its supporters established the amateur football club Friends of Lokomotiv Plovdiv as a means of organised support, and in 1988 the official fan club – Club of the Supporters of Lokomotiv Plovdiv – was established as the first of its kind in Bulgaria. The political environment of the time was unfavourable towards independently formed organisations.

In the 1980s the club was extremely popular and had the biggest away invasions, including more than 30,000 people at the final of the 1983 Soviet Cup. The club also holds record attendance for a championship home game - more than 40,000 people versus Beroe. When Lokomotiv won the title in 2003–04 there were 50,000 people in the city's main square to celebrate the victory.

At the start of the reconstruction of Lokomotiv Stadium, the section for the most devoted fans was to be called Bessica Tribune after the ancient Thracian tribe whose artefacts were discovered nearby.  Since the project's postponement, the name has been used collectively for the most dedicated followers.

Lokomotiv Plovdiv also has a football hooligan fan base, with some of the most prominent factions being Lauta Hools, Got Mitt Uns, Napoletani 1995, and Lauta Youths. Lauta Hools, also called Usual suspects, founded in 1992, adhere to the British form of support and are casuals, and it is not uncommon to see the Union Jack in the stands as a result.

Friendships
Lokomotiv fans have a long-standing friendship with fans of the Italian team SSC Napoli due to their creation of the name Napoletani Ultras Plovdiv. On many occasions, fans from both clubs traveled to watch each other's games.

Rivalries
Lokomotiv's main rival is the neighbouring city club of Botev Plovdiv, and both form the Plovdiv derby. The Plovdiv derby is considered to be the second fiercest rivalry in Bulgarian football, after the Eternal derby of Bulgarian football. The rivalry poses a symbolic importance to supporters due to an assumed superiority that comes with winning the derby.

Another rivalry is with CSKA Sofia and is the fiercest intercity football rivalry in Bulgaria, because of the historical competition between the cities of Plovdiv and Sofia as cultural, political and economical centres.

Players

First-team squad  

 

For recent transfers, see Transfers summer 2022 and Transfers winter 2022–23.

Out on loan

Foreign players
Up to twenty foreign nationals can be registered and given a squad number for the first team in the Bulgarian First League, however only five non-EU nationals can be used during a match day. Those non-EU nationals with European ancestry can claim citizenship from the nation their ancestors came from. If a player does not have European ancestry he can claim Bulgarian citizenship after playing in Bulgaria for 5 years.

Retired numbers

Player of the Season

Source:

Honours

Domestic
First League:
  Winners (1): 2003–04
  Runners-up (2): 1972–73, 2020–21
  Third place (5): 1945, 1968–69, 1973–74, 1991–92, 2004–05

Bulgarian Cup:
  Winners (2): 2018–19, 2019–20
  Runners-up (7): 1940, 1942, 1948, 1959–60, 1970–71, 1981–82, 2011–12

Bulgarian Supercup:
  Winners (2): 2004, 2020
  Runners-up (2): 2012, 2019

Cup of the Soviet Army:
  Winners (1): 1983

Regional
Plovdiv Championship
  Winners (6): 1936, 1938, 1942, 1945, 1946, 1948

Trimontium Cup
  Winners (2):  1938, 1946

Source: lokomotivpd.com

European record

Matches

Notes
 1Q: First qualifying round
 2Q: Second qualifying round
 3Q: Third qualifying round
 PO: Play-off round

UEFA club rankings

Current ranking

Recent seasons

League positions

Records

Player records 

Hristo Bonev holds the records for most Lokomotiv Plovdiv league appearances (404) and goals (180).

Bulgarian league top scorers

Bulgarian Footballer of the Year

Club records 
 Biggest league win: 9–1 vs Dobrudzha Dobrich (21 September 2002) — 2002–03
 Biggest league defeat: 0–9 vs Slavia Sofia (2 March 1986) — 1985–86
 Biggest cup win: 8–1 vs Pirin Blagoevgrad — 19467–0 vs Torpedo Dimitrovgrad — 1954
 Biggest cup defeat: 0–6 vs Minyor Pernik — 1998–99 
 Most league points in a season: 75 — 2003–04
 Most league goals in a season: 74 — 2003–04
 Most consecutive wins in the league (single season): 6 — from 25 April 1971 to 13 June 1971 from 23 February 2002 to 16 March 2002 from 9 August 2003 to 20 September 2003 from 10 April 2004 to 8 May 2004 from 24 April 2016 to 28 May 2016 from 13 September 2019 to 29 October 2019
 Most consecutive league games unbeaten (single season): 11 — from 17 February 2002 to 13 April 2002 from 9 August 2003 to 9 November 2003 from 6 December 2020 to 21 April 2021
 Record European competition home attendance: 40,000 vs  Juventus (10 March 1965) — Fairs Cup, Third round 2nd leg, 1964–65
As of 25 July 2022

Managers

Notable managers

Managerial history

 Stefan Paunov (1969–71)
 Ivan Manolov (1971–75)
 Borislav Milenov (1975–76)
 Аtanas Dramov (1977–78)
 Dimitar Grigorov (1978–79)
 Petar Dimitrov (1979–80)
 Аtanas Dramov (2) (1982–83)
 Atanas Angelov (Aug 5 1983–Sept 26 1983)
 Hristo Bonev (Oct 29 1983–Dec 22 1985)
 Аtanas Dramov (3) (Feb 15 1986–April 19, 1986)
 Gancho Peev (Aug 9 1986–Nov 30 1986)
 Hristo Bonev (2) (Feb 14 1987–May 28, 1988)
 Stancho Bonchev (Aug 13 1988–Jun 3 1989)
 Mihail Georgiev (Aug 12 1989–Jun 8 1991)
 Аtanas Dramov (4) (Aug 17 1991–Oct 31 1992)
 Petar Miladinov (Nov 21 1992–Jun 5 1993)
 Ivan Vutsov (Aug 14 1993–Mar 26 1994)
 Voyn Voynov (Mar 26 1994–June 31, 1994)
 Ivan Kuchukov (Aug 19 1994–June 10, 1995)
 Ivan Gluhchev (Sept 2 1995–Oct 28 1995)
 Gancho Peev (2) (Aug 12 1995–Aug 26 1995)
 Vasil Ankov (Nov 5 1995–Feb 24 1996)
 Ivan Marinov (Mar 2 1996–1996)
 Dinko Dermendzhiev (Mar 9 1996–May 11, 1996)
 Krasimir Manolov (Aug 9 1996–Dec 7 1996)
 Ivan Marinov (2) (1996–1997)
 Stancho Bonchev (2) (Feb 22 1997–May 31, 1997)
 Radoslav Zdravkov (1997–1997)
 Аtanas Dramov (5) (1997–1998)
 Ivan Gluchev (2) (May 1998–Sept 1998)
 Dinko Dermendzhiev (2) (1998–1999)
 Georgi Vasilev (1999–1999)
 Vladimir Fatov (1999–1999)
 Vasil Ankov (2) (1999–2000)
 Ayan Sadakov (2000–2000)
 Eduard Eranosyan (2000–2001)
 Stefan Draganov (2001–2001)
 Dimitar Dimitrov (2001–2003)
 Eduard Eranosyan (2) (2003–2005)
 Ayan Sadakov (2) (2005–2006)
 Ivan Marinov (3) (Sept 1 2006–Sept 23 2007)
 Yasen Petrov (Sept 24 2007–Mar 14 2008)
 Dragi Kanatlarovski (Mar 20 2008–Sept 29 2008)
 Ayan Sadakov (3) (Sept 29 2008–Aug 10 2009)
 Ivan Marinov (4) (Aug 10 2009–Nov 1 2009)
 Stefan Genov (Nov 1 2009–Dec 26 2009)
 Naci Şensoy (Dec 26 2009–June 30, 2010)
 Hristo Bonev (3) (July 1, 2010–Oct 31 2010)
 Nedelcho Matushev (Sept 28 2010–Apr 23 2011)
 Saša Nikolić (April 23, 2011 – June 30, 2011)
 Dragi Kanatlarovski (2) (June 17, 2011–Nov 8 2011)
 Emil Velev (Nov 8 2011–Oct 9 2012)
 Stefan Genov (2) (Oct 13 2012–June 30, 2013)
 Aleksandar Stankov (July 1, 2013 – May 29, 2014)
 Emil Velev (2) (June 9, 2014 – July 8, 2014)
 Nedelcho Matushev (2) (July 9, 2014–Sept 29 2014)
 Hristo Kolev (Oct 1 2014–Feb 26 2016)
 Ilian Iliev (Feb 26 2016–Oct 17 2016)
 Eduard Eranosyan (3) (Oct 31 2016–Apr 9 2017)
 Voyn Voynov (2) (Apr 19 2017–Oct 30 2017)
 Bruno Akrapović (Oct 30 2017–Nov 10 2020)
 Aleksandar Tunchev (Nov 11 2020–Apr 7 2022)
 Aleksandar Tomash (Apr 11 2022–present)

As of 13 July 2022

Source: loko-pd.com

References

External links 

Official websites
 Official website 
 Historical website (part of the official website) 
 Official fan-website 
 Lokomotiv Plovdiv at UEFA
Media
 Official YouTube channel
 Official Facebook page

 
Football clubs in Bulgaria
Association football clubs established in 1926
1926 establishments in Bulgaria
Plovdiv